= Netherlands Economic Medal Cabinet =

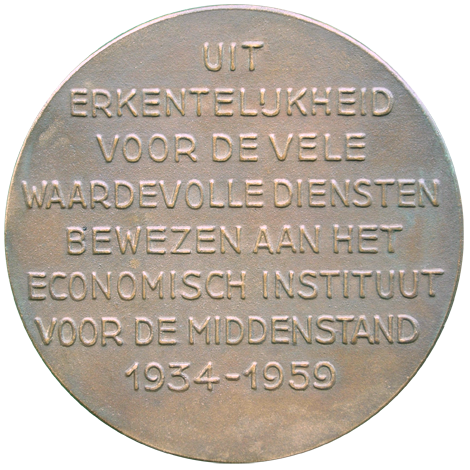
Dr. W.L. Groeneveld Meijer, founding father NEPK NEPK1115 reverse (1959, 85mm, Pol Dom)

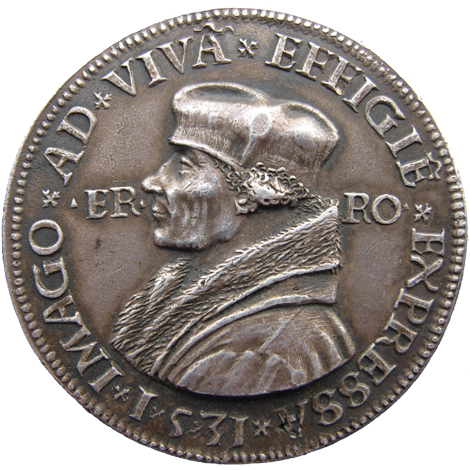
Portrait of Erasmus with stola NEPK1850 obverse (1531, 35,5mm, Hieronymus Magdeburger)

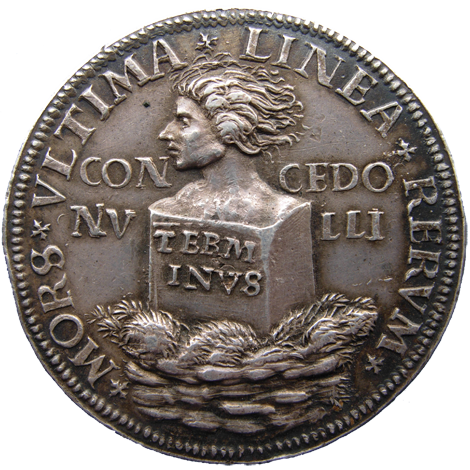
Portrait of Erasmus with stola NEPK1850 reverse (1531, 35,5mm, Hieronymus Magdeburger)

The Netherlands Economic Medal Cabinet (Nederlands Economisch PenningKabinet / NEPK) is located in Rotterdam, at Erasmus University Rotterdam – campus Woudestein.

== History ==
NEPK was created on June 15, 1961. Its founder is dr. W.L. (Willem Lyckele) Groeneveld Meijer (1897–1963), former director of the Economic Institute for Retail (Economisch Instituut voor de Middenstand) of the Ministry of Economic Affairs. The medals collected by Groeneveld Meijer during his active career formed the start of the NEPK collection. Being an alumnus of the Netherlands School of Commerce (Nederlandsche Handels-Hoogeschool / NHH) and having defended his dissertation at NHH in 1924, Groeneveld Meijer decided in 1963 to transfer the Foundation NEPK and his medal collection to his alma mater, since 1939 known as the Netherlands School of Economics (Nederlandse Economische Hogeschool / NEH). In 1973 NEH merged into Erasmus University Rotterdam, which is now the owner of the NEPK medal collection.

== Mission statement ==
The mission statement of the Foundation NEPK formulated at its creation can be summarized as “bringing together, acquiring, expanding and maintaining a collection of (Dutch) medals, in particular medals from 1900 onwards that were created with a motive of an economic nature”. Over the years, the scope has somewhat broadened, notably to include medals related to Erasmus University Rotterdam and the person Desiderius Erasmus.

== Collection ==
The NEPK collection is housed at Erasmus University Rotterdam, campus Woudestein. Two medal presentations can be viewed in the Erasmus Gallery in the Erasmus Building. These presentations make use of interactive touchscreen display cases. (Opening Monday-Friday 9.00 – 17.00 hours; free entrance). New presentations are made regularly. The website of NEPK (www.nepk.nl) allows to search the NEPK collection database of presently over 2800 medals. In principle the database contains all medals in the collection.

== Curators ==
- 1961 - 1963 dr. W.L. Groeneveld Meijer
- 1963 ‐ 1996 prof. J.R. Zuidema
- 1996 ‐ 2006 prof. G.W. de Wit
- 2006 ‐ 2025 dr. H. Gerritsen
